Pseudalastor is an Australian genus of potter wasps.

Species
The following species are included in Pseudalastor:

Pseudalastor anguloides Giordani Soika, 1962
Pseudalastor carpenter Borsato, 2003 
Pseudalastor cavifemur Giordani Soika, 1962 
Pseudalastor chloroticus Borsato, 1994
Pseudalastor concolor (Saussure, 1853) 
Pseudalastor houstoni Borsato, 1994 
Pseudalastor lamellatus Giordani Soika, 1993 
Pseudalastor metathoracicus (Saussure, 1855)
Pseudalastor superbus Giordani Soika, 1977
Pseudalastor tridentatus (Schulthess-Rechberg, 1935) 
Pseudalastor xanthozonellus Vecht, 1981

References

Biological pest control wasps
Potter wasps